A. americanus may refer to:

An abbreviation of a species name. In binomial nomenclature the name of a species is always the name of the genus to which the species belongs, followed by the species name (also called the species epithet). In A. americanus the genus name has been abbreviated to A. and the species has been spelled out in full. In a document that uses this abbreviation it should always be clear from the context which genus name has been abbreviated.

Some of the most common uses of A. americanus are:

 Acorus americanus, a sweet flag
 Alces americanus, or North American moose, a mammal
 Amblyseius americanus, a mite
 Ammodytes americanus, a sandlance
 Anacanthobatis americanus, a ray
 Apogon americanus, a cardinalfish
 Aprostocetus americanus, a hymenopteran insect
 Arctus americanus, a lobster
 Argulus americanus, a fish louse
 Astragalus americanus, a milkvetch
 Astropecten americanus, a starfish

See also
 Americanus (disambiguation)